Cedarbrook is an unincorporated community in Cheltenham Township in Montgomery County, Pennsylvania, United States. Cedarbrook is located at the intersection of Pennsylvania Route 309 and Greenwood Avenue, just over the city line of Philadelphia. Cedarbrook is home to the Cedarbrook Shopping Center, a major shopping attraction for many Cheltenham Township and North Philadelphia shoppers.

References

Unincorporated communities in Montgomery County, Pennsylvania
Unincorporated communities in Pennsylvania
Cheltenham Township, Pennsylvania